"If Only I Had My Mind on Something Else" is a pop ballad recorded by the Bee Gees. It was written by Barry and Maurice Gibb. It was the first track on the album Cucumber Castle. A remastered version was released in 1990 on Tales from the Brothers Gibb.

Recording
"If Only I Had My Mind on Something Else" was recorded on 25 September 1969 at the IBC Studios in London, same day as "High and Windy Mountain" and "One Bad Thing". On the next day (September 26) they recorded two new songs that was intended for the album "Turning Tide" and "Sweetheart".

Release and aftermath
The song was released in the US as the follow up to "Don't Forget to Remember" but it failed to make any impact and stalled at #91. Following this, Barry and Maurice went their separate ways, both releasing solo singles with limited success. Barry and Robin reconciled in the summer of 1970 and the Bee Gees reunited later that year.

Personnel
 Barry Gibb — lead and harmony vocal, guitar
 Maurice Gibb — bass, piano, guitar
 Terry Cox — drums
 Uncredited — strings and orchestra arrangement

Chart performance

References

1970 singles
1970 songs
British folk songs
Bee Gees songs
Polydor Records singles
Atco Records singles
Songs written by Barry Gibb
Songs written by Maurice Gibb
Song recordings produced by Robert Stigwood
Song recordings produced by Barry Gibb
Song recordings produced by Maurice Gibb